Turkey is a city in Hall County, Texas, United States. The population was 421 at the 2010 census, down from 494 at the 2000 census.

Geography
Turkey is located in southwestern Hall County at  (34.394248, −100.894736). Texas State Highway 70 runs through the east side of the city as 9th Street, leading north  to Clarendon and south  to Matador. Texas State Highway 86 runs through the center of Turkey as Main Street, leading east  to Estelline and west  to Tulia.

Climate
According to the Köppen climate classification system, Turkey has a semiarid climate, BSk on climate maps.

History
Turkey was platted in 1907.

A tall monument standing on edge within city limits of Turkey, honors the former musician Bob Wills, who was considered by authorities as the co-founder of Western swing.

Demographics

2020 census

As of the 2020 United States census, there were 317 people, 134 households, and 99 families residing in the city.

2000 census
As of the census of 2000, 494 people, 207 households, and 127 families resided in the city. The population density was 598.9 people per square mile (232.6/km). The 274 housing units averaged 332.2 per square mile (129.0/km). The racial makeup of the city was 71.86% European-American, 5.67% black, 0.40% Native American, 0.40% Asian, 21.26% from other races, and 0.40% from two or more races. Hispanics or Latinos of any race were 31.17% of the population.

Of the 207 households, 28.0% had children under the age of 18 living with them, 53.6% were married couples living together, 4.8% had a female householder with no husband present, and 38.6% were not families; 36.7% of all households were made up of individuals, and 22.7% had someone living alone who was 65 years of age or older. The average household size was 2.39 and the average family size was 3.20.

In the city, the population was distributed as 28.3% under the age of 18, 6.1% from 18 to 24, 21.9% from 25 to 44, 20.6% from 45 to 64, and 23.1% who were 65 years of age or older. The median age was 40 years. For every 100 females, there were 98.4 males. For every 100 females age 18 and over, there were 91.4 males.

The median income for a household in the city was $19,833, and for a family was $24,423. Males had a median income of $20,125 versus $21,250 for females. The per capita income for the city was $9,809. About 28.4% of families and 32.4% of the population were below the poverty line, including 42.5% of those under age 18 and 22.4% of those age 65 or over.

Notable people

 Amarillo Slim, professional gambler
 Bob Wills, Western Swing musician
 Joe Barnhill, country music singer-songwriter

Education
The city is served by the Turkey-Quitaque Independent School District.

PETA controversy
In November 2011, animal rights organization PETA petitioned the town to temporarily change its name to "Tofurky".

First Phillips 66 service station built in Texas
The first Phillips 66 service station built in Texas opened on July 27, 1928, on the corner of 5th Street and Main in Turkey, Texas. In January 2019, this service station was recognized by the Texas Historical Commission as a Recorded Texas Historic Landmark and a marker dedication ceremony to unveil the state historical marker is planned to take place at the service station in April 2020.

References

External links
 Hall County TXGenWeb

Cities in Hall County, Texas
Cities in Texas